"You Got It (The Right Stuff)" is a 1988 single from New Kids on the Block. The lead vocals were sung by Jordan Knight and Donnie Wahlberg. The second single from the group's second album Hangin' Tough, it peaked at number 3 on the Billboard Hot 100 Singles Chart in early 1989, while topping the UK charts in November 1989. On the album, it was simply listed as "The Right Stuff"; the change to the single was probably to avoid confusion with Vanessa Williams' debut hit "The Right Stuff", which charted earlier that year. A Spanish version of the song was made ("Autentica") and peaked at number 11 in Spain.

Chart performance
"You Got It" reached the top 40 of the US Billboard Hot 100 singles chart for the week of January 14, 1989. It reached its peak of number 3 the week of March 11, 1989. Altogether, "You Got It (The Right Stuff)" spent 5 weeks in the top 10, 8 weeks in the top 20, and 13 weeks in the top 40. The song was number one in Australia in August 1989, and in the UK (on its second release) in November 1989. On March 29, 1989, the single was certified Gold. "You Got It (The Right Stuff)" is commonly regarded as one of the band's signature songs. In the music video, Jordan Knight is seen wearing a Bauhaus T-shirt. The song ranked as number 92 on VH1's 100 Greatest Songs of the '80s.

In popular culture
The song can be heard in the 1989 film The Wizard. In 1992, "Weird Al" Yankovic parodied the song on his Off the Deep End album as "The White Stuff", a loving ode to the cream filling in Oreo cookies. It was also joked about in the episode "Not All Dogs Go to Heaven" on Family Guy. In a King of the Hill episode, Boomhauer says about a boy band called 4Skore, "You talkin' 'bout that dang ol' boy band, man. Talkin' 'bout prancin' around, ol' 'Oh, oh, oh, oh...'". Kid Rock, on his album The Polyfuze Method, sampled the song on his "Killin' Brain Cells". This song is featured on the game Dance Dance Revolution X2. In the season 8 episode of It's Always Sunny in Philadelphia "Charlie's Mom Has Cancer", Dr. Jinx (Sean Combs) plays the song on his electric bass to help Dennis have feelings again. In an after-credits clip of a season 6 episode of Psych that Joey McIntyre co-starred in, Joey, James Roday and Dulé Hill dance to the song.

In the 2012 Adam Sandler comedy film That's My Boy, the character Todd Peterson (Andy Samberg) receives a tattoo of New Kids on the Block on his back as a child, which later becomes warped as he grows up. Upon discovery of this, his father Donny Berger (Adam Sandler) responds by singing the chorus of "You Got It (The Right Stuff)" with the lyrics changed so that he sings: "Oh, oh, oh, oh, oh, you got a bad tattoo. Oh, oh, oh, oh, oh, their heads are fucking warped."

The song is used by David Wright of the New York Mets as his walk-up song.

In the first episode of Fuller House, DJ, Stephenie, Kimmy, and the rest of the cast dance to a 30-second clip of the song.

The song is featured twice in the 2017 big-screen version of It, based on the Stephen King novel. The song was danced to by Selling Sunset star Chrishell Stause and Gleb Savchenko on "'80s Night" on Dancing With the Stars.

The song is the main theme of "The Right Stuff" segment on ABC's Good Morning America.

Track listings
CD single CBS, cassette single, vinyl single
 "You Got It (The Right Stuff)" – 4:09
 "You Got It (The Right Stuff)" [remix] – 3:32

12-inch maxi – US
"You Got It (The Right Stuff)" [12" version] – 5:18
"You Got It (The Right Stuff)" [7" version] – 3:32
"You Got It (The Right Stuff)" [instrumental] – 5:15

7-inch single – Europe
 "You Got It (The Right Stuff)" – 4:09
 "You Got It (The Right Stuff)" [remix] – 3:32

12-inch maxi – Australia
 "You Got It (The Right Stuff)" [12" version] – 5:18
 "You Got It (The Right Stuff)" [7" version] – 3:32
 "You Got It (The Right Stuff)" [instrumental] – 5:15

7-inch single – Australia
 "You Got It (The Right Stuff)" – 4:09
 "You Got It (The Right Stuff)" [instrumental] – 5:15

Personnel
 Danny Wood - backing vocals 
 Donnie Wahlberg - co-lead and backing vocals
 Joey McIntyre - backing vocals
 Jonathan Knight - backing vocals
 Jordan Knight - co-lead and backing vocals

Charts

Weekly charts

Year-end charts

Certifications

Cover versions
On the fourth series of The X Factor Australia, contestants the Collective performed this song. The all-female singing group Fifth Harmony performed this song on the October 28, 2014, episode of the MTV series Faking It.

References

External links
 Official video

1988 songs
1988 singles
New Kids on the Block songs
Number-one singles in Australia
Synth-pop songs
UK Singles Chart number-one singles
Columbia Records singles
Songs written by Maurice Starr
Song recordings produced by Maurice Starr
Black-and-white music videos